Tsiatsungõlmaa training area is one of the six military training fields used by the Estonian Defence Forces. The Tsiatsungõlmaa training area is part of the Nursipalu training area.

Establishment 
Tsiatsungõlmaa  training area was established on 14 February 2008, with the Government Order No. 79 "Establishment of the Defense Forces Tsiatsungõlmaa training area and handing over the state property."

See also 
Keskpolügoon

References 

Military installations of Estonia
Võru Parish